{{Infobox person
| name               = Ayush Anand
| image              = 
| image_size         = 
| caption            = 
| birth_name         = Delhi India
| birth_date         = 
| nationality        = Indian
| occupation         = Actor
| known_for          = Ishqbaaaz, Tu Sooraj, Main Saanjh, Piyaji, Balika Vadhu| notable_works      = 
| parents            = 
| relatives          = 
}}

Ayush Anand is an Indian television actor. He has worked in television shows like Ishqbaaaz, Tu Sooraj, Main Saanjh, Piyaji on StarPlus and Balika Vadhu'' on Colors TV.

Education 
Anand attended Springdales Public School New Delhi. He received his Bachelor of Business Administration degree from the Guru Nanak Institute of Management and Information Technology New Delhi in Delhi. He started working from his college days. He had done theatre and street plays with Kabira Art Theatre, Delhi and founded the group with his college friends. He worked in the Tanzil Theatre Group (later changed to Bhaav Arts of Expression) for three years.

Television

References

External links

Living people
Indian male television actors
Indian male soap opera actors
Male actors in Hindi television
21st-century Indian male actors
1989 births